Ferenc Marschall (2 October 1887 – 23 January 1970) was a Hungarian politician, who served as Minister of Agriculture for two months in 1938.

References
 Magyar Életrajzi Lexikon	

1887 births
1970 deaths
Politicians from Timișoara
People from the Kingdom of Hungary
Agriculture ministers of Hungary